The Sulawesi fantail (Rhipidura teysmanni) is a species of bird in the family Rhipiduridae. It is endemic to Sulawesi in Indonesia. Its natural habitats are subtropical or tropical moist lowland forests and subtropical or tropical moist montane forests

There are three subspecies recognized:

 R. t. teysmanni Büttikofer, 1892 - montane southwestern Sulawesi
 R. t. toradja Stresseman, 1931 - montane central and southeastern Sulawesi
 R. t. coomansi van Marle, 1940 - montane northern Sulawesi

The subspecies coomansi was recognized by the International Ornithological Congress in 2022.

References

Endemic birds of Sulawesi
Rhipidura
Birds described in 1892
Taxa named by Johann Büttikofer
Taxonomy articles created by Polbot